The Copper Mountain Solar Facility is a 802 megawatt (MWAC) solar photovoltaic power plant in Boulder City, Nevada, United States. The plant was developed by Sempra Generation. When the first unit of the facility entered service on December 1, 2010, it was the largest photovoltaic plant in the U.S. at 58 MW.

 With the opening of Copper Mountain V in March 2021, it again became the largest in the United States. It is co-located with the 64 MW Nevada Solar One, 150 MW Boulder Solar, and 300 MW Techren Solar projects in the Eldorado Valley, thus forming a more than 1 gigawatt (GW) solar generating complex.   By comparison, generating capacity at the nearby Hoover Dam is about 2 GW.

History

First unit
Sempra Generation completed the 10 MW demonstration plant named "El Dorado Solar"  near the existing El Dorado natural gas-fired power station and the Nevada Solar One concentrated solar power plant in December 2008.
 It was the company's first bold venture into utility-scale solar generation.  A 48 MW second phase named "Copper Mountain" was constructed from January to December 2010 at a cost of about $141 million.

At its construction peak more than 350 workers were installing the 775,000 First Solar panels on the  site.

Second unit
Based on its successes with the first unit, a second 150 MW unit was approved adjacent to the site in late 2010 and a construction plan announced On August 4, 2011.  The first 92 MW phase came online in January 2013, and the 58 MW expansion phase was eventually completed in early 2015.

Third unit
Construction on the third, and thus far largest, 250 MW unit began in 2013 and was completed in early 2015, with a formal dedication ceremony on 30 April 2015.

Fourth unit
Copper Mountain Solar 4 is the fourth unit of the Copper Mountain Solar complex.  Construction on the 94 MW unit, adjacent to the grouping of Units 1 and 2, commenced in 2015.  It also sustained about 350 construction jobs at peak, and completed year-end 2016.  In contrast to prior units, the rows of panels run north to south, with solar trackers tilting the rows from east to west in order to maximize energy production.

Fifth unit
The 250 MW Copper Mountain 5 unit went online in March 2021.

Facility unit details

Electricity production

See also

 List of photovoltaic power stations
 List of power stations in Nevada
 Solar power in Nevada
 Solar power plants in the Mojave Desert
 Solar power in the United States
 Renewable energy in the United States
 Renewable portfolio standard

References

Solar power in the Mojave Desert
Buildings and structures in Boulder City, Nevada
Solar power stations in Nevada
Photovoltaic power stations in the United States
Energy infrastructure completed in 2010